Tricalysia atherura is a species of plant in the family Rubiaceae. It is found in Cameroon and Gabon. Its natural habitat is subtropical or tropical moist lowland forests. It is threatened by habitat loss.

References

Tricalysia
Vulnerable plants
Taxonomy articles created by Polbot